The Vancouver Film Critics Circle presents an award for Best British Columbia Film as part of its annual critics awards program, honouring the best films made within the Canadian province of British Columbia within the previous year.

Winners

2000s

2010s

2020s

References

Vancouver Film Critics Circle Awards
Awards for best film